Beernem is a rural municipality in the Belgian province of West Flanders, located southeast of Bruges. The municipality comprises the towns of Beernem proper, Oedelem and Sint-Joris. On January 1, 2006 Beernem had a total population of 14,642, mostly in Beernem proper and Oedelem. The total area is 71.68 km² which gives a population density of 204 inhabitants per km².

Gallery

References

External links

 

 
Municipalities of West Flanders